Buendia station is an underground Manila Metro Rail Transit (MRT) station situated on Line 3. It is one of two underground stations that can be found on the line, the other being Ayala. The station lies near the EDSA–Kalayaan Flyover and Gil Puyat Avenue (Buendia Avenue) in Makati.

It is the tenth station for trains headed to Taft Avenue and the fourth station for trains headed to North Avenue. It is the second to the last station south of the Pasig River and is also the last underground station in the line before the line goes above ground at Guadalupe station. It is one of five stations on the line where passengers can catch a train going in the opposite direction without paying a new fare due to the station's layout. The other four stations are Araneta Center-Cubao, Shaw Boulevard, Boni, Ayala, and Taft Avenue. Excluding Araneta Center-Cubao station, it is also one of four stations on the line with its concourse level located above the platform.

Nearby landmarks
The station serves the Makati Central Business District and is the nearest station to the Department of Trade and Industry and Department of Energy (Philippines) offices; as well as the headquarters of major banks like Metropolitan Bank and Trust Company, Development Bank of the Philippines, and Banco de Oro. Several business process outsourcing (BPO) buildings line the avenue right outside the station including those of SM Cyberzone. The famous Makati Avenue and Jupiter Street entertainment districts, as well as Century City, can also be accessed from this station via taxi or jeepneys. Posh residential subdivisions such as Forbes Park, Bel-Air, and Urdaneta Villages are found in the vicinity of the station.

Transportation links
The station has jeepneys, buses, and taxicabs outside the station. Jeepneys that leave from the station head along Gil Puyat Avenue (Buendia) for western Makati, the Central Business District, and Pasay. The Buendia station of EDSA Carousel, located along EDSA, is interconnected to the MRT station through a pedestrian footbridge. eSakay, an electric jeepney, also plies the station and is bound for Circuit Makati and Mandaluyong City Hall.

Operating Schedule

Express Train Service 
Note: This service was discontinued in 2014.

See also
List of rail transit stations in Metro Manila
MRT Line 3 (Metro Manila)

References

Manila Metro Rail Transit System stations
Railway stations opened in 1999
Buildings and structures in Makati
Makati Central Business District
1999 establishments in the Philippines